Adenaria is a monotypic genus of plants in the family Lythraceae containing the single species Adenaria floribunda. Its common names include fruta de pavo. It is native to Mexico, the Dominican Republic, Haiti, and parts of Central and South America.

References

Lythraceae
Lythraceae genera
Monotypic Myrtales genera